The 1985 NAIA Division I football season was the 30th season of college football sponsored by the NAIA, was the 16th season of play of the NAIA's top division for football.

The season was played from August to November 1985 and culminated in the 1985 NAIA Champion Bowl, played this year on December 21, 1985 at Estes Stadium in Conway, Arkansas, on the campus of the University of Central Arkansas, for the second straight year.

Central Arkansas and Hillsdale played to a tie, 10–10, in the Champion Bowl and both teams were named co-national champions. It was Central Arkansas' second NAIA title (and second straight shared title) and Hillsdale's first.

Conference realignment

Conference changes
 The Columbia Football League began play this season, with the combined football membership of the former Evergreen (NAIA Division I) and Pacific Northwest (NAIA Division II) conferences. The new league had fourteen members from British Columbia, Oregon, and Washington.

Membership changes

Conference standings

Conference champions

Postseason

See also
 1985 NAIA Division II football season
 1985 NCAA Division I-A football season
 1985 NCAA Division I-AA football season
 1985 NCAA Division II football season
 1985 NCAA Division III football season

References

 
NAIA Football National Championship